Ambewadi is a small Village/hamlet in Khanapur Taluk in Belgaum District of Karnataka State, India. It comes under Ambewadi Panchayath. 

It belongs to Belgaum Division . It is located 31 KM towards South from District head quarters Belgaum. 517 KM from State capital Bangalore

Ambewadi Pin code is 591302 and postal head office is Khanapur Town .

Ambewadi is surrounded by Belgaum Taluk towards North , Bylahongal Taluk towards East , Supa Taluk towards South , Haliyal Taluk towards South .

Belgaum , Dharwad , Curchorem Cacora , Saundatti-Yellamma are the nearby Cities to Ambewadi.

 Ambewadi is a village in Belgaum district in the southern state of Karnataka, India.

References

Villages in Belagavi district